The Battle of Belchite refers to a series of military operations that took place between 24 August and 7 September 1937, in and around the small town of Belchite, in Aragon during the Spanish Civil War.

Prelude

After failed attempts to capture Brunete, the Republican military leadership decided to try a new series of offensives to slow down the Nationalist advance in the north. A new campaign, therefore, was planned for Aragon. The decision was based on political as well as military considerations, as the government saw it as a way to decrease Anarchist and Workers' Party of Marxist Unification (POUM) influence in the region by bringing in communist troops and incorporating three Anarchist divisions into the newly designated Army of the East under command of General Sebastián Pozas. Another objective of the planned offensive was to take Zaragoza, the capital of Aragon, which was only a few kilometres behind enemy lines. Capturing the regional capital offered more than symbolic significance, because it was also the communication centre of the whole Aragon front. The first year of the war in this part of Spain had emphasised that the possession of key towns was of far greater importance than the control of wide areas of open countryside. The Nationalists had only three divisions, the 51st, 52nd and 105th, spread across the three hundred kilometres of front, with the majority of their troops concentrated in towns. General Pozas and his Chief of Staff Antonio Cordon set up their headquarters in Bujaraloz. Their plan was to break through at seven different points on the central one hundred-kilometre stretch between Zuera and Belchite. The object of splitting their attacking forces was to divide any Nationalist counter-attack and to offer fewer targets for bombing and strafing than at Brunete.

Republican offensive

The Republican Army of the East, together with the XI and XV International Brigades, started its offensive with eighty thousand men, three aviation squadrons with Polikarpov I-16 (moscas), Polikarpov I-15 (chatos) (ninety aeroplanes in total) and one hundred and five T-26 tanks in three main and five secondary directions on a one hundred-kilometre stretch between Zuera and Belchite. On the first two fronts (north and centre), the Republicans managed to take only vacant territories. On the southern portion of the front, the Republican Army took the village of Mediana immediately and Quinto was taken on the fourth day of the offensive. In the village of Codo, there were three Requeté companies that tied down two Republican brigades. The fiercest resistance was encountered in Belchite, where seven thousand Nationalist defenders resisted until 7 September in the surrounded town when Republicans took it. These delays allowed the Nationalists to bring up reinforcements and the full-scale offensive on Zaragoza failed.

Nationalist counteroffensive

With five Nationalist divisions whereof two were withdrawn from the Madrid front, artillery and 65 Fiat CR.32, Heinkel He 46, Savoia Sm-79 and Messerschmitt Bf 109, the Nationalist counter offensive started on 30 August and ended on 6 September. The only major Nationalist success was the shooting down of five I-15s, but they were unable to break Republican lines.

Aftermath
Although the Republicans gained some initial success and managed to push the front line ten kilometres deeper into Nationalist territory, both of the main objectives of the offensive failed. The Nationalists did not postpone their big offensive in the north, as they had done before the Battle of Brunete, and the attempt to capture Zaragoza failed.

Ruins as national monument
The whole town was destroyed. Franco ordered that the ruins be left untouched as a "living" monument of war. A new town was constructed near the former. The holes and caves in Lobo Hill south of Belchite from where the Spanish Republican artillery positions fired towards what is now Belchite Old Town have been preserved and are open to visitors.

See also

 List of Spanish Republican military equipment of the Spanish Civil War
 List of Spanish Nationalist military equipment of the Spanish Civil War

Corbera d'Ebre

References

 
 

1937 in Spain
Belchite
Belchite 1937
Belchite
Province of Zaragoza
August 1937 events
September 1937 events